Minear is a surname. Notable people with the surname include:

Jeffrey P. Minear, administrative assistant to Chief Justice John G. Roberts, Jr.
Richard Minear, Professor of History at the University of Massachusetts Amherst
Sarah Minear, West Virginia state senator
Tim Minear (born 1963), American screenwriter and director